Ayunda Faza Maudya (born 19 December 1994), known as Maudy Ayunda, is an Indonesian pop singer and actress.

Personal life and education 
Ayunda was born to parents Didit Jasmedi R. Irawan and Mauren Jasmedi (born 1968). She has a younger sister named Amanda Khairunissa. She married Jesse Jiseok Choi, a Korean-American businessman, in May 2022.

Ayunda was a runner-up in a speech competition at her school. She speaks English, Javanese, Indonesian, Mandarin, and Spanish. After graduating from the British School Jakarta, Ayunda enrolled at St Hilda's College in University of Oxford to study Philosophy, Politics and Economics (PPE) and graduated in 2016.

Maudy has decided to join Stanford for her master's degree instead of Harvard, because the former offers a joint degree of MBA and Education, which is a combination of her passions.

Career 
Maudy Ayunda's first film role was in Untuk Rena (2005) alongside Surya Saputra. Her next film was Sang Pemimpi (2009), directed by Riri Riza, where she played the role of Zakiah Nurmala, the protagonist's love interest. Her song "Mengejar Mimpi" was featured on the soundtrack.

In 2011, Ayunda appeared in two musicals, Rumah Tanpa Jendela and Tendangan dari Langit. In 2012, she had a role in Malaikat Tanpa Sayap, alongside Adipati Koesmadji.

Ayunda released her debut album, Panggil Aku..., in 2011 that featured 10 songs, one of which she wrote "Tetap Bersama".  In 2012, her vocal of "Perahu Kertas", written by Dewi Lestari was used for the soundtrack of Perahu Kertas.

In January 2014, she recorded a duet "By My Side" with David Choi. The song was well-received in Indonesia and released on iTunes Music Indonesia and as a YouTube video on 19 March 2014. She released her second studio album Moments on 1 April 2015. In 2015, she also released three singles: "Cinta Datang Terlambat", "Bayangkan Rasakan" and "Untuk Apa" and earned a Multi-Platinum award for selling over 200.000 copies.

In 2016, Walt Disney Pictures chose Maudy to sing the soundtrack "Seberapa Jauh Ku Melangkah", Indonesian translation of "How Far I'll Go" for the film Moana.

In 2020, Maudy was named to Forbes "30 Under 30 Asia" list in the entertainment and sports category.

In March 2022, she was appointed as a spokesperson for the upcoming G20 summit in Indonesia, scheduled to be held in November 2022 Her appointment sparked criticism from some, with some saying that she has no experience in the diplomacy, international relations and calling it a "gimmick". Bloomberg News questioned her appointment, calling it is a vanity appointment by the government to connect with the young population, while young Indonesians face high unemployment and rising living costs. Wasito Raharjo, a political researcher at BRIN, says her appointment is an attempt to "dismiss critcism from the youth on critical issues."

Activism 
Ayunda is involved in social, political and economic issues in Indonesia, especially those impacting the lives of young people. In 2015, she accompanied the Prime Minister of the United Kingdom, David Cameron, during his visit to Jakarta.

Ayunda is involved in the campaign against modern slavery, which includes forced labor, marriage and dangerous labor. In March 2017, she was appointed a spokesperson against modern slavery at the Vice Presidential Palace in Jakarta. Through her work, she tries to acquaint her audience with the realities of modern slavery, and uses social media platforms to promote that message.

Discography

Studio albums

Soundtrack album

Singles

Filmography

Film

Publications

Books

Awards and nominations

References

External links 

  
 
 
 
 

1994 births
Indonesian actresses
Indonesian activists
Indonesian women activists
21st-century Indonesian women singers
Indonesian film actresses
Indonesian television actresses
Indonesian pop singers
Javanese people
Living people
People from Jakarta
Alumni of St Hilda's College, Oxford
Alumni of the University of Oxford
Stanford University alumni
Stanford Graduate School of Education alumni
Stanford Graduate School of Business alumni